Chigu may refer to:
 Chigu, Iran, a village in Chaharmahal and Bakhtiari Province, Iran
 Chigu District, Taiwan
 Chigu, Tibet, a village